Nathan Robert Laurence Crawford (born  5 November 1986 in Brisbane, Queensland) is an Australian baseball player for the Auckland Tuatara of the Australian Baseball League.

Career
He was originally signed as a pitcher to the Minnesota Twins organization in 2005 for the Gulf Coast Twins until 2006.

Back in Australia, Crawford plays for the Windsor Royals winning 5 consecutive Queensland titles. He has represented the Queensland Rams in the Claxton Shield. Currently in the Australian Baseball League he has pitched for the Canberra Cavalry. As well as the Brisbane Bandits He is younger brother to Tristan Crawford who has played for the Australia national baseball team and is also playing for the Cavalry. He now has his own twitch channel https://www.twitch.tv/major_mangoes

References

External links

1986 births
Living people
Auckland Tuatara players
Expatriate baseball players in New Zealand
Australian expatriate baseball players in the United States
Baseball pitchers
Baseball players from Brisbane
Brisbane Bandits players
Canberra Cavalry players
Grand Prairie AirHogs players
Gulf Coast Twins players
Laredo Broncos players
Australian expatriate sportspeople in New Zealand